The Mărgăuța is a right tributary of the river Săcuieu in Romania. It flows into the Săcuieu near Scrind-Frăsinet.

References

Rivers of Romania
Rivers of Cluj County